South Surrey White Rock Learning Centre is a public high school in Surrey, British Columbia part of School District 36 Surrey.

High schools in Surrey, British Columbia
Educational institutions in Canada with year of establishment missing